Bakhtiarlu (also Romanized as Bakhtīārlū) is a village in Qeshlaq Rural District, Abish Ahmad District, Kaleybar County, East Azerbaijan Province, Iran. At the 2006 census, its population was 64, in 13 families.

References 

Populated places in Kaleybar County